The Jamaica national rugby league team represents Jamaica in international rugby league tournaments. Administered by the Jamaica Rugby League Association, the team made their full international debut at the 2009 Atlantic Cup against the United States.

The team will make their first appearance at the Rugby League World Cup in 2021. They primarily wear yellow jerseys with green shorts and green socks. Their strongest line-up is composed mainly of British Jamaican professional and semi-professional players, alongside amateurs based in Jamaica.

History

Early years
In July 2004 the Jamaica Rugby League Association was born. In 2005 a domestic competition was formed featuring four teams (Duhaney Park Sharks, Vauxhall Vultures, Jamaica Defence Force and Olympic Angels), and in 2006 a representative side was selected for the first time to play against a touring side from the West Yorkshire Police.

An Intercollegiate competition was launched in 2010 and now features six Universities and Colleges (University of the West Indies, University of Technology, Mico University College, Portmore Community College, GC Foster College and Excelsior Community College). There is also a thriving junior program with a number of High Schools and Primary Schools playing the sport. There is also a Division 2 competition featuring.

Jamaica played their first full international game against the United States national side in Jacksonville, Florida in the 2009 Atlantic Cup. In October that year, Jamaica got their first victory at international level against Canada as part of the 2010 Atlantic Cup.

Attempts at World Cup Qualification
In 2011 Jamaica entered the Rugby League World Cup for the first time as they contested the 2013 Rugby League World Cup qualifying Atlantic section, they failed to qualify after defeating South Africa and losing to the United States.

In 2015 Jamaica aimed to improve on their 2011 disappointment and succeed in the Americas qualification in order to qualify for their first ever World Cup in 2017 but were ultimately unsuccessful.

World Cup Qualification Success

In 2018, Jamaica entered the World Cup qualifying stages for a third time with the matches also doubling up as the 2018 Americas Rugby League Championship.  On 13 November 2018, Jamaica played Canada for a place in the qualification play-off. They defeated Canada 38-8 with Ben Jones-Bishop getting two tries in the victory. On 17 November 2018, Jamaica met the United States at Hodges Stadium, Jacksonville, Florida to play for a place in the 2021 Rugby League World Cup. Jamaica raced into a 16-0 lead within the first 30 minutes of the game only for the United States to score 2 tries before half-time and pull the score back to 16-10 at the break. The second half was a tighter contest with defence becoming the priority for Jamaica and the half would ultimately end scoreless. Jamaica beat the United States 16-10, defeating United States for the first time in Jamaica's history and qualifying for the 2021 World Cup.

2021 Rugby League World Cup
Jamaica made their Rugby League World Cup debut against Ireland at Headingley losing 48-2.
In the second group stage match, Jamaica suffered a heavy defeat to New Zealand but scored their first ever try at the tournament. In the final group stage match, Jamaica were comprehensively beaten by Lebanon 74-12.

Current squad

Squad selected for the 2021 Rugby League World Cup.

Competitive Record

Jamaica have played 22 games in their history with their first full international being played in 2009 against the United States, despite the team having been formed 3 years previously in 2006.

They have only played two nations more than once, playing Canada 9 times and the United States 8 times.  Jamaica regularly compete against these two nations in the Americas Rugby League Championship, having taken part in all 3 editions of this competition to date.  They have played 5 other nations, each once.  The first of these teams was South Africa in 2011.  In 2016, Jamaica played games in Europe for the first time, taking on Ireland, comfortably defeating them 68-16 and Wales, drawing 16-16.  In 2017, Jamaica played their toughest opponent to date, taking on 2-time World Cup runners-up France, a game they would lose 12-34.

Jamaica played their 20th game when they took on United States in the 2021 Men's Rugby League World Cup qualifying play-off, winning 16-10 and earning a place in the 2021 Rugby League World Cup in the process.

World Cup
Jamaica will make their debut at the 2021 Rugby League World Cup having failed to qualify on 2 occasions previously in 2013 and 2017.  They will become the second nation from the Americas region to play in the world cup after United States first took part in 2013.

Americas Rugby League Championship

The Americas Rugby League Championship was introduced through the RLIF policy of international expansion and development.  Previous to the tournament's existence, the only regional competition in the Americas was the annual Colonial Cup however only the United States and Canada competed in this.  The new competition would feature 3 teams with Jamaica being the new edition.  Jamaica have competed in all 3 editions to date.  In 2016, they would finish 3rd and last but would improve their position by a single place in the following 2 editions, finishing as runners-up in 2017 and being crowned champions in 2018.  That year also saw the expansion of the competition to 4 teams with the addition of Chile.

Honours
Regional:
Americas Rugby League Championship:
Champions (1): 2018
Runners-up (1): 2017

Notable players 
The following is a list of Jamaican representative players who have played in a top-tier professional rugby league competition i.e. the National Rugby League and/or the Super League:
 Richie Barnett
 Alex Brown
 Lamont Bryan
 Omari Caro
 Ashton Golding
 Greg Johnson
 Karl Pryce
 Leon Pryce
 Waine Pryce
 Paul White
 Ben Jones-Bishop
  Michael Lawrence
 Dominic Young
 Will Pryce

See also

 Rugby league in the West Indies
 West Indies national rugby league team

References

External links
Jamaica Rugby League Association

National rugby league teams
Sports teams in Jamaica
Jamaican rugby league teams
R